Little Neck Parkway (formerly Little Neck Road) is the easternmost major north/south route in northern Queens, New York City. North of Northern Boulevard (NY 25A), the parkway is a local residential  street. South of there, it is a two- to four-lane road, which becomes divided south of Grand Central Parkway. South of Hillside Avenue, it widens to six lanes. Its southern terminus is at Jericho Turnpike (NY 25) at the Queens-Nassau border.

Little Neck Parkway has one of the few at-grade railroad crossings of the Long Island Rail Road in New York City, and the only at-grade crossing of the Port Washington Branch of the LIRR.

The Q36 bus serves Little Neck Parkway from Jamaica Avenue to the Little Neck Long Island Rail Road station on weekdays. Express routes include the QM3 bus between the Long Island Expressway and Northern Boulevard, and QM5, QM8 and QM35 buses between 260th Street and the Long Island Expressway.

References

Streets in Queens, New York